Leioheterodon modestus, also known as the blonde hognose snake, is a species of harmless snake in the family Pseudoxyrhophiidae. It is endemic to Madagascar. It is considered a species of least concern. The mineralized skeleton of this snake contains apatite.

References

Pseudoxyrhophiidae
Snakes of Africa
Reptiles of Madagascar
Endemic fauna of Madagascar
Taxa named by Albert Günther
Reptiles described in 1863